Amazonic Spanish (español amazónico), also known as Charapa Spanish, Loreto-Ucayali Spanish or Jungle Spanish (español de la selva), is a variety of Spanish spoken in the Amazon, especially in Ecuador, parts of Colombia, Southern Venezuela and the Peruvian provinces of Loreto, San Martín and Ucayali. Amazonic Spanish is also spoken in areas of Brazil adjoining Loreto and Ucayali and in the Amazonas Department of Colombia.

Distinctive features

Morphosyntax
One of the distinguishing features of Amazonic Spanish is the method of constructing the possessive form: speakers say "de la X su Y" (of the X its Y), instead of standard Spanish "la Y de X" (the Y of X).  Another distinctive grammatical feature is the use of possessive forms in place of certain genitive forms; compare standard Spanish "Le preguntó a la yaminahua delante de mí" (He asked the Yaminahua woman in front of me) with the Loreto-Ucayali "Le preguntó a la yaminahua en mi delante" (He asked the Yaminahua woman in my front).

Personal names are prefixed with a definite article (el or la, depending on the gender).

Phonology

Amazonic Spanish also incorporates words and expressions borrowed from local indigenous languages.

Status 

Amazonic Spanish is classified as a separate language from standard Spanish by Ethnologue, with its own ISO 639-3 code: spq.

References

External links 
 Spanish in Brazil

Spanish dialects of South America
Languages of Peru
Spanish Brazilian
Spanish Colombian
Spanish Peruvian
Upper Amazon
History of Amazonia